Polynoidae is a family of marine Polychaete worms known as "scale worms" due to the scale-like elytra on the dorsal surface. Almost 900 species are currently recognised belonging to 9 subfamilies and 167 genera. They are active hunters, but generally dwell in protected environments such as under stones. The group is widely distributed from shallow intertidal waters to hadal trenches. They are the most diverse group of polychaetes in terms of genus number and second most diverse in terms of species number which is almost 8% of all segmented worm species.

Description
Most Polynoidae species are short and flattened, but can reach as much as 20 cm in length and 10 cm width in Eulagisca gigantea and Eulagisca uschakovi. Individuals are usually covered almost entirely by elytra, which can be shed and regenerated in many species. The elytra of some species are faintly bioluminescent, and leave glowing traces around the mouthparts of their predators, making those predators more likely to be attacked in turn.

Deep sea
The first deep-sea species of Polynoidae was collected at 1230 m during the Challenger Expedition and several a number of subfamilies appear to be restricted to the deep sea below 500 m. Species have colonised submarine caves and hydrothermal vents. Deep sea species are characterised by a partial or complete loss of antennae, fewer segments, a reduction in jaws and delicate elytra.

Phylogenetic relationships
The Polynoidae has been shown to be monophyletic, however relationships within the family are unclear and hence the number of valid subfamilies has been repeatedly revised in recent years. One of the main deep sea subfamilies, the Macellicephalinae has been consistently recovered as paraphyletic, and it has been proposed that ten Polynoid subfamilies could be synonymized with it to create a homogeneous clade characterised by a lack of lateral antennae. More recently, however, one of the synonymized subfamilies was reinstated.

Genera
The following Polynoidae genera are recognised as valid as of June 2020:

Acanthicolepis
Acholoe
Admetella
Adyte
Alentia
Alentiana
Allmaniella
Anotochaetonoe
Antarctinoe
Antinoe
Antipathipolyeunoa
Arcteobia
Arctonoe
Arctonoella
Augenerilepidonotus
Australaugeneria
Australonoe
Austrolaenilla
Austropolaria

Barrukia
Bathyadmetella
Bathybahamas
Bathycanadia
Bathycatalina
Bathyedithia
Bathyeliasona
Bathyfauvelia
Bathyhololepidella
Bathykermadeca
Bathykurila
Bathylevensteina
Bathymacella
Bathymariana
Bathymiranda
Bathymoorea
Bathynoe
Bathynotalia
Bathypolaria
Bathytasmania
Bathyvitiazia
Bayerpolynoe
Benhamipolynoe
Benhamisetosus
Branchinotogluma
Branchiplicatus
Branchipolynoe
Bruunilla
Brychionoe
Bylgides

Capitulatinoe
Cervilia
Chaetacanthus

Dilepidonotus
Diplaconotum
Disconatis
Drieschella
Drieschiopsis

Enipo
Eucranta
Eulagisca
Eunoe
Euphione
Euphionella
Eupolynoe
Euphione

Frennia

Gastrolepidia
Gattyana
Gaudichaudius
Gesiella
Gorekia
Gorgoniapolynoe
Grubeopolynoe

Halosydna
Halosydnella
Halosydnopsis
Harmothoe
Hartmania
Hemilepidia
Hermadion
Hermadionella
Hermenia
Hermilepidonotus
Hesperonoe
Heteralentia
Heteropolynoe
Hololepida
Hololepidella
Hylosydna
Hyperhalosydna

Intoshella

Kermadecella

Lagisca
Lepidametria
Lepidasthenia
Lepidastheniella
Lepidofimbria
Lepidogyra
Lepidonopsis
Lepidonotopodium
Lepidonotus
Leucia
Levensteiniella
Lobopelma

Macellicephala
Macellicephaloides
Macelloides
Malmgrenia
Medioantenna
Melaenis
Minusculisquama

Natopolynoe
Neobylgides
Neohololepidella
Neolagisca
Neopolynoe
Nonparahalosydna

Olgalepidonotus
Ophthalmonoe

Parabathynoe
Paradyte
Paragattyana
Parahalosydna
Parahalosydnopsis
Parahololepidella
Paralentia
Paralepidonotus
Paranychia
Parapolyeunoa
Pararctonoella
Pareulagisca
Peinaleopolynoe
Pelagomacellicephala
Perolepis
Pettibonesia
Phyllantinoe
Phyllohartmania
Phyllosheila
Podarmus
Polaruschakov
Polyeunoa
Polynoe
Polynoella
Polynoina
Pottsiscalisetosus
Pseudohalosydna
Pseudopolynoe

Robertianella
Rullieriella
Russellhanleya

Scalisetosus
 Sheila 
Showapolynoe
Showascalisetosus
Subadyte

Telodrieschia
Telolepidasthenia
Tenonia
Thermopolynoe
Thormora
Tottonpolynoe

Uncopolynoe

Vampiropolynoe
Verrucapelma

Yodanoe
Ysideria

References

Further information

External links
 List of currently accepted Polynoidae species at the World Record of Marine Species
An information system for polychaete families and higher taxa (Polikey)

Phyllodocida
Annelid families